The Balearic Islands Football Federation (FFIB) is the football association responsible for all competitions of any form of football developed in the Balearic Islands. It is integrated into the Royal Spanish Football Federation and its headquarters are located in Palma de Mallorca and has offices in the capitals of the provinces.

Competitions
 Men's
 Tercera División (Group 11)
 Regional Preferente (3 groups: Mallorca, Menorca and Ibiza/Formentera)
 Primera Regional (1 group)
 Segunda Regional (1 group)
 Tercera Regional (2 groups: A and B)
 Youth
 Liga Nacional Juvenil Group IX
 Divisiones Regionales
 Women's
 Divisiones Regionales

See also 
Balearic Islands autonomous football team
List of Spanish regional football federations

References

External links 
  

Spanish football associations
Sports organizations established in 1926
Football in the Balearic Islands
1926 establishments in Spain